Gay Male Pornography: An Issue of Sex Discrimination is a 2004 book by the anti-pornography pro-feminist author Christopher N. Kendall.

Background
The 2000 Little Sisters Book and Art Emporium v. Canada case in Canada was the first test of whether R. v. Butler applies to gay male and lesbian pornography. The court held that gay and lesbian pornography does constitute sex discrimination.

Thesis
Christopher N. Kendall supports the conclusions of the Supreme Court of Canada in the Little Sisters Book and Art Emporium v. Canada decision. Supporting the case, Kendall argues that gay male pornography reinforces social attitudes that help create systemic inequality on the basis of sex and sexual orientation. He rejects the arguments of pro-pornography advocates, instead claiming that gay male pornography reinforces misogyny and homophobia. Because of this, Kendall believes that gay male pornography should be banned under Canada's anti-pornography laws.

Reviews
William D. Araiza, writing for the Journal of the History of Sexuality, states that while the book makes a powerful argument, Kendall nonetheless "overstates his case. In particular, he undervalues, in my view, the role gay pornography can play in subverting ideas of male dominance and of socially constructed maleness in general."

Michelle Evans states,

References

2004 non-fiction books
Anti-pornography feminism
Gay male pornography
Feminist books
LGBT feminism
Men and feminism
Non-fiction books about pornography
University of British Columbia Press books